Klaxon is a trademark for a brand of electromechanical horn or alerting device.

Klaxon may also refer to:

Klaxons, an English indie rock band
The Klaxons (Belgian band), a Belgian accordion-based band
Klaxon (EP), an EP by Immi
Klaxon (magazine), a Brazilian literary magazine
 Klaxon Oil Corporation, a fictional company in the 1979 thriller novel Nothing Lasts Forever